Rhydian James Roberts (born 14 February 1983), also known mononymously as Rhydian, is a Welsh baritone singer, television presenter and musical theatre actor. He made his name by finishing second in series 4 of The X Factor, and has since become more widely known.

Early years
Born in Sennybridge, Rhydian attended the Pontsenni Cylch Meithrin in Brecon and then Ysgol y Bannau Welsh medium school. He played rugby union for the Gwernyfed rugby football club as a junior and later for his school, as well as cricket for Powys County Junior teams. Following a gap year teaching in a small school in South Africa, Rhydian won a bursary to the Royal Birmingham Conservatoire at the University of Central England.

Career

The X Factor
Rhydian has said: "I'm very proud of what I achieved on X Factor. I'm a showman and it gave me the chance to put on a show". Amongst other songs, he sang: 
 A full theatrical account of "The Phantom of the Opera"
 "Get the Party Started"
 "Go West"

During the live stages of competition, eventually his "trademark white hair and flamboyant dress sense made him an audience favourite." His version of "The Impossible Dream" became the keynote track on his first album.

Recording Career
2008's highest-selling album by a male newcomer (600,000 copies), was Rhydian's eponymous debut, Rhydian.  It incorporated material by Jim Steinman His second, O Fortuna (2009), co-produced by composer Karl Jenkins, included duets with Kiri te Kanawa and Bryn Terfel. Rhydian was a guest on Morriston Orpheus Choir's CD To Where You Are (Sain, 2011). There were two further albums during 2011: Waves, with covers of classic 1980s pop and Caneuon Cymraeg (Welsh Songs), a mix of classic Welsh songs and original songs.

Returning to his core repertoire of classics and pop anthems, Rhydian's fifth album, One Day Like This featured duets with Kerry Ellis and Bonnie Tyler. Within a week of release, it topped  the Official Classical Album charts, occupying the spot for ten weeks. It also reached 19 in the Official Album charts, and topped the Classic FM Chart.

In 2015, he released Carry the Fire, an album inspired by the Rugby World Cup 2015. It included his version of World In Union - which was the official song of the Rugby World Cup - and songs related to all of the Home Nations.

His seventh album, The Long Road, was released in 2018 and added to Spotify in 2020. It includes covers of Castle on the Hill by Ed Sheeran, and The Sound of Silence by Paul Simon.

His eighth album was released in February 2023, and became his 2nd album to top the UK Classical Albums Chart (after One Day Like This). He has announced it will be his final studio album, before ending his recording career with a Greatest Hits album later in the year.

Concerts, galas and solo tours
Rhydian toured the UK in 2008, 2013 and 2014–15. The title of his third tour "One Day Like This", came from his fifth album. During 2018 he toured the UK in Les Musicals, co-starring with Jonathan Ansell.

Stage
Rhydian made his debut in the 2010 European tour of The War of the Worlds – Live on Stage! (Parson Nathaniel), and has toured the UK in musical theatre since then.  From 2010 to 2013 he appeared in We Will Rock You (Khashoggi, Chief of Police), Grease (40th anniversary tour, playing "Teen Angel") and  Rocky Horror Show (Rocky). He has played pantomime leads in Beauty and the Beast, praised for carrying the show "rather spectacularly" with "remarkable gravitas", and  Cinderella.
In 2015 he played Pontius Pilate in Jesus Christ Superstar and in 2016 the Dentist in Little Shop of Horrors. During Christmas 2017 he appeared in Aladdin at the SSE Arena, Belfast.

Television
During 2009, Rhydian, One Year On was aired by S4C. In 2011, Rhydian presented an eight-part television entertainment series for S4C, with his album Caneuon Cymraeg (Welsh Songs) being released to tie in with it.

Discography

References

External links

Rhydian Roberts at BBC Wales
Rhydian Roberts biography from BBC Wales Music
What's On Wales interview
"Rhydian's new album" movie video at YouTube
Rhydian on Premier Christian TV

1983 births
Welsh-language singers
Welsh operatic baritones
Opera crossover singers
British male musical theatre actors
British pop singers
British television presenters
Living people
The X Factor (British TV series) contestants
People educated at Llandovery College
Alumni of Birmingham Conservatoire
21st-century Welsh male singers